Guerrino and the Savage Man is an Italian literary fairy tale written by Giovanni Francesco Straparola in The Facetious Nights of Straparola.

It is Aarne-Thompson type 502, and the oldest known written variant of it.  Other tales of this type include Iron John and Georgic and Merlin.

Synopsis

A king, Filippomaria, had an only son, Guerrino.  One day, while hunting, the king captured a wild man.  Imprisoning him, he gave the keys to the queen.  He set out hunting again, and Guerrino wanted to see the wild man.  The wild man stole an arrow he carried and promised to give it back if Guerrino freed him.  Guerrino did so and warned him to flee; the wild man told him that he would and left. (The wild man in fact had been a handsome youth who had despaired of the love of a lady and so took to the wild.)

The queen woke and questioned everyone.  Guerrino told her that no one would be punished but him, because he did it.  The queen took two faithful servants, gave them money, and sent Guerrino away.  The king returned and found the wild man gone.  The queen told that Guerrino had done it, and then that she had sent Guerrino away, which enraged him even more, that she should think he would hold his son in less regard than the wild man.  He searched for him but did not find him.

The servants agreed to kill Guerrino, but they could not agree on how to divide the loot; while they still had not settled, a fine young man greeted them and asked to come with him, and Guerrino agreed.  This was the same wild man; he had met a fairy suffering from a distemper, who had burst out laughing at the sight of him and so been cured.  She transformed him, endowed him magic powers, and gave him a magic horse.

They came to a town, Irlanda, ruled by King Zifroi with two beautiful daughters, Potentiana and Eleuteria.  Guerrino took lodgings.  The young man made to go on, but Guerrino persuaded him to stay.  At the time, the lands were attacked by a wild horse and a wild mare that ruined crops and killed beasts, men, and women.  The two servants told the king that Guerrino had boasted that he could kill these horses.  The king summoned him and promised to reward him if he did it; when Guerrino hesitated, he threatened to execute him if he did not.  The young man told him to get a blacksmith's services from the king, and then have the blacksmith make enormous horseshoes for the young man's horse.  Then he had Guerrino ride the horse until he met the horse, at which point he should dismount, free the horse, and climb a tree.  Guerrino did this, the horses fought, and the wild one was defeated.  The king was pleased, but the servants furious because of their failure.  They said that Guerrino had boasted likewise of the wild mare, and the king set him to defeat it as well; he did, as he had the horse.

The night after, he was woken by a noise and found a wasp in a honey pot, which he freed.

The king summoned him, said he had to reward him, and offered him one of his daughters, if Guerrino could tell beneath their veils which was Potentiana, who had golden hair, and which Eleuteria, who had silver hair.  If he guessed wrong, he would be executed.  Guerrino went back to his lodgings, where the young man told him that the wasp would fly three times around Potentiana, and she would drive it off three times, that night.  Then he should identify her.  Guerrino said he did not know how he could reward him for his favors.  The young man told him that he was the wild man, and so he was but returning what Guerrino had done for him, and his name was Rubinetto.

Guerrino went to the palace, where the princesses were entirely covered with white veils.  The king told him to make his choice, time was passing, but Guerrino insisted on the full-time.  The wasp buzzed about Potentiana, and she drove it off.  Guerrino said she was Potentiana, and they married.   Rubinetto married Eleuteria.  Guerrino's parents heard of him, and he returned to them with his wife and Rubinetto and his wife, where they lived in happiness.

See also

The Magician's Horse
The Hairy Man
Dapplegrim
The Little Girl Sold with the Pears
Thirteenth
Boots and the Troll
The Grateful Beasts
Esben and the Witch
The Gold-bearded Man

References

Italian fairy tales
ATU 500-559